The Twin Islands (Cree language: Mah-Nah-Woo-Na-N) are similarly shaped Arctic islands in the Qikiqtaaluk Region of Nunavut, Canada. The group includes North Twin and South Twin islands.

Geography
Approximately  separate the two islands. Landscape characteristics include, unconsolidated sand, gravel, lakes, marshland, sand dunes, and wide tidal flats.

Notable landmarks include Cotter Point on North Twin, and Lucy Point on South Twin.

Flora
The habitat includes small stands of trees: dwarf birch, juniper, white spruce, and willows, along with heaths and shrubs.

Conservation
The Twin Islands are a Canadian Important Bird Area (#NU034), an International Biological Program site (Site 6–2), and a Key Terrestrial Migratory Bird Site (NU Site 56). The Twin Islands Wildlife Sanctuary is part of the James Bay Preserve.

Avifauna
Notable bird species include: American pipit, Arctic tern, Canada goose, dunlin, eastern white-crowned sparrow, horned lark, Lapland longspur, least sandpiper, purple sandpiper, red-necked phalarope, Savannah sparrow, semipalmated plover, semipalmated sandpiper, waterfowl, and willow ptarmigan.

Polar bears frequent the area.

References

 Sea islands: Atlas of Canada; Natural Resources Canada

Islands of James Bay
Uninhabited islands of Qikiqtaaluk Region
Important Bird Areas of Qikiqtaaluk Region